Alejandra Cisenros (born 18 April 1995) is a Mexican former professional tennis player.

She made her WTA Tour debut at the 2014 Monterrey Open, in both singles and doubles. On the ITF Junior Circuit, Cisneros achieved a career-high ranking of world No. 18, after winning a prestigious tournament, in December 2013, in her last month of eligibility. She reached one final on the ITF Women's Circuit and had trained in Florida since 2014.

In 2015, Cisneros began studying at Armstrong State University in Savannah, Georgia, where she competed for the Armstrong Pirates and was studying economics.

In 2016, Cisneros transferred to North Carolina State University to play Division 1 collegiate tennis. Where she competed and now coaches for the Wolfpack and is studying accounting.

ITF Circuit finals

Doubles: 1 (0–1)

References

 
 

1995 births
Living people
Sportspeople from Tampico, Tamaulipas
Mexican female tennis players
NC State Wolfpack women's tennis players
21st-century Mexican women